John Stein may refer to:

Jock Stein (1922–1985), Scottish football player and manager (Celtic F.C.)
Johan Stein (1871–1951), Dutch astronomer and Jesuit priest
John Stein (academic), Dean of Students of Georgia Tech
John Stein (guitarist), American jazz guitarist
John Stein (physiologist), professor of physiology at Oxford University
Johnny Stein (1891/5–1962), American jazz drummer and bandleader

See also
John Steiner (disambiguation)